The Dresden Frankfurt Dance Company is a contemporary dance ensemble of eighteen dancers based in Dresden and Frankfurt, Germany.

It was founded in 2005 as The Forsythe Company by American choreographer William Forsythe following the closure of the Frankfurt Ballet, established in 1963. The ensemble further pursues the creative work carried out by Forsythe for 20 years with the Frankfurt Ballet, including producing works in the areas of performance, installation, film, and educational media, and drew most of its dancers from the prior company.

The company is supported by a public–private partnership including the German states of Saxony and Hesse, the cities of Dresden and Frankfurt, and private sponsors. It is in residence at both the Festspielhaus Hellerau in Dresden and the Bockenheimer Depot in Frankfurt.

In 2015, the creative directorship was taken over by the Italian dancer and choreographer Jacopo Godani, upon which the company took its present name.

References

Literature

External links
Dresden Frankfurt Dance Company 
Dresden Frankfurt Dance Company 
The Forsythe Company (Archive) 
The Forsythe Company (Archive) 

Dance in Germany
Culture in Dresden
Culture in Frankfurt
Contemporary dance companies
2005 establishments in Germany
Performing groups established in 2005